WLTC (103.7 Lite FM) is a radio station that is licensed in Cusseta, Georgia and serves the city of Columbus, Georgia and its metro area. It broadcasts an adult contemporary format.

In 2019, WLTC was the first station (not counting those stunting) to flip to Christmas music for the 2019 season, doing so at roughly the same time as 2018's first-in-the-nation flip, WTRV in Grand Rapids, Michigan.

References

External links

LTC
Radio stations established in 2009